François Ruhlmann (11 January 1868 – 8 June 1948) was a Belgian conductor.

Life and career
Born in Brussels, Ruhlmann was a pupil of Joseph Dupont in his native city. As a child he sang in the chorus at the Théâtre Royal de la Monnaie, and at 7 played the oboe in the orchestra.

Ruhlmann's first conducting engagement was at the Théâtre des Arts in Rouen in 1892. This was followed by further work in Liège and Antwerp, before a return to the Théâtre Royal de la Monnaie in 1898.

François Ruhlmann began his career at the Opéra-Comique, Paris on 6 September 1905 (with Carmen), then at the death of Alexandre Luigini became principal conductor in 1906 (retiring from the position in 1914). Although mobilised in 1914, he returned occasionally during the war to conduct.

From 1911 he conducted at the theatre of the Casino of Aix-les-Bains. Later he championed works by Dukas, Debussy, Fauré and Ravel at the Concerts Populaires in Brussels. In 1920 Ruhlmann tried to mediate in a dispute involving the musicians unions in Paris, although he sympathised with the players.

In 1919 he moved to the Palais Garnier, where he remained until 1938.

He conducted many operatic premieres:
 Les Pêcheurs de Saint Jean (Widor) 1905
 Les Armaillis (Doret) 1906
 Le roi aveugle (February) 1906
 Ariane et Barbe-bleue (Dukas) 1907
 Le Chemineau (Leroux) 1907
 La Habanéra (Laparra) 1908
 The Snow maiden (Rimsky-Korsakov) Paris premiere 1908
 Chiquito (Nouguès) 1909
 On ne badine pas avec l'amour (Erlanger) 1910
 Bérénice (Magnard) 1911
 L’Ancêtre (Saint-Saëns) Paris premiere 1911
 L’heure espagnole (Ravel) 1911
 Thérèse (Massenet) Paris premiere 1911
 La sorcière (Erlanger) 1912
 La Lépreuse (Lazzari) 1912
 La vida breve (Falla) Paris premiere 1913
 Mârouf (Rabaud) 1914
 Lorenzaccio (Moret) 1920
 Esther, princesse d'Israël (Mariotte) 1925

He was long associated with Pathé, for which he made many recordings, including six complete operas after 1910, including Rigoletto (Verdi) on 28 sides; Faust (Gounod) on 56 sides; and Il trovatore (Verdi), 1912 on 38 sides. He also conducted the 1911 Pathé recording of Carmen (54 sides).

François Ruhlmann died in Paris at age 80.

References

1868 births
1948 deaths
Musicians from Brussels
Belgian conductors (music)
Belgian male musicians
Male conductors (music)
Music directors (opera)